The Webster City Community School District is a rural public school district headquartered in Webster City, Iowa.

In 2012, the Webster City School District enrolled approximately 1600 students, with an estimated 700 receiving free or reduced lunch, 200 students on IEP's, 100 ELL students and a total staff of 248.

The district is mostly in Hamilton County, and also includes portions of Webster and Wright counties. In addition to Webster City, it serves Blairsburg, Duncombe, Kamrar, and Williams.

History

The school district was established in 1854.

Beginning in the 2015–2016 school year, the Webster City district entered into a whole grade sharing arrangement with the Northeast Hamilton Community School District in which the latter sent secondary students to Webster City. This was done to address an enrollment decrease in Northeast Hamilton. In 2018, the two districts decided to hold an election on whether they should merge. On Tuesday, April 3 the election was held, with 94% of the Northeast Hamilton voters and 99% of Webster City district voters favoring consolidation. On July 1, 2019, the Northeast Hamilton district merged into the Webster City district.

It recently expanded with an 11 million dollar bond issue for the construction of the new competition gymnasium.

Schools  
Pleasant View Elementary School (PK - 1st grade)
Sunset Elementary School (2nd - 4th grades)
Northeast Hamilton Elementary School (PK - 4th grades)
Webster City Middle School (5th - 8th grades)
Webster City High School  (9th - 12th grades)

The school district also has an Alternative High School (Hamilton High).

Webster City High School

Athletics 
The Lynx compete in the North Central Conference in the following sports:

Cross Country 
Volleyball 
Football 
 1936 State Champions
Basketball
Swimming 
Wrestling
Track and Field
Golf 
 Girls' 2000 Class 2A State Champions
Tennis
Soccer
Baseball 
Softball 
 2-time State Champions (1988, 2001)

See also
List of school districts in Iowa
List of high schools in Iowa

References

External links 
Webster City Community Schools

School districts in Iowa
Education in Hamilton County, Iowa
Education in Webster County, Iowa
Education in Wright County, Iowa
School districts established in 1854
1854 establishments in Iowa